Sheaves Cove is a local service district and designated place in the Canadian province of Newfoundland and Labrador. It is on the Port au Port Peninsula along the shore of St. George's Bay. There is a small tourist alcove just off the highway (Route 460) where views of the waterfalls and the ocean are visited often.

Geography 
Sheaves Cove is in Newfoundland within Subdivision E of Division No. 4.

Demographics 

Government 
Sheaves Cove is a local service district (LSD) that is governed by a committee responsible for the provision of certain services to the community. The chair of the LSD committee is Marilyn Rowe.

See also 
List of communities in Newfoundland and Labrador
List of designated places in Newfoundland and Labrador
List of local service districts in Newfoundland and Labrador

References 

Designated places in Newfoundland and Labrador
Local service districts in Newfoundland and Labrador